Fengyun 2-07 or FY-2-07 ( meaning Wind Cloud 2-07), also known as Fengyun-2F or FY-2F, is a Chinese weather satellite operated by China's National Satellite Meteorological Centre. Part of the Fengyun programme, it was the sixth Fengyun 2 geostationary satellite to be launched.

Fengyun 2-07 was launched by a Long March 3A carrier rocket, with the serial number Y22, flying from Launch Area 3 at the Xichang Satellite Launch Centre. The launch took place on 13 January 2012 at 00:56 UTC, and resulted in the successful deployment of the satellite into a geosynchronous transfer orbit. After raising itself into its operational geostationary orbit, by means of an FG-36 apogee motor, the satellite will be positioned at a longitude of 86.5 degrees East.

It is spin-stabilised at a rate of 100 rpm, and carries a five-channel Stretched Visible and Infrared Spin Scan Radiometer, or S-VISSR, capable of producing visible light and infrared images of the Earth. It will produce a full-disc image every thirty minutes, as well as imaging smaller areas of interest. In addition to S-VISSR, Fengyun 2-07 also carries an x-ray detector to monitor the Sun, and detect solar flares.

References

Spacecraft launched in 2012
Spacecraft launched by Long March rockets